Shem Tob's Hebrew Gospel of Matthew is the oldest extant Hebrew version of the Gospel of Matthew. It was included in the 14th-century work Eben Boḥan (The Touchstone) by the Spanish Jewish Rabbi Shem-Tov ben Isaac ben Shaprut. George Howard has argued that Shem Tov's Matthew comes from a much earlier Hebrew text that was later translated into Greek and other languages. A characteristic feature of this Hebrew gospel is the appearance in 20 places of השם (HaShem,  "the Name"), in the abbreviated form ה״, where the Gospel of Matthew has Κύριος ("the Lord").

Origin 

Shem-Tob ben Isaac Ibn Shaprut was the author of an anti-Christian religious treatise, The Touchstone, completed in 1380 and revised in 1385 and 1400. Often referred to as "The Logic of Shem Tob", it argues against the belief that Jesus is God. It also argues against attributing the role of Messiah to Jesus.

For this reason Shem Tob's Hebrew Gospel of Matthew, which is included in this work, is considered the oldest surviving text of a New Testament book in Hebrew.

In 1987, George Howard said (pp. vii, 234) that the translation of the Gospel of Matthew in Shem Tob's work long predates the 14th century and may better represent the original text. His view was rejected by W.L. Petersen and Petri Luomanen. A refutation of the theory that Shem Tob's Hebrew version of Matthew represents the original Hebrew source behind the Gospel of Matthew, using Matt. 5:18 as a test case, is presented on Jerusalem Perspective in David Bivin's, "Has a Hebrew Gospel Been Found?".

Revision of the previous hypothesis and evidences of Medieval and Provençal Origins 
The main points that are the object of controversy are the following:

1.	The oldest version of a gospel in Hebrew language. Hebrew Matthew has been preserved in the book XII or XIII (according to the two recensions of the piece of religious controversy “The Touchstone” of Shem Tob Ibn Shaprut of the most significant manuscripts which have lasted to our times. The fact of being part of a controversial book involves some problems about authorship, date of the translation and historical context.

2.	Identifying marks of the base text or Vorlage. The introduction of the gospel deals with the hypothesis of George Howard, which attributed the version to the genuine Gospel of the Hebrews mentioned by Papias in the second century AD.In the second edition he maintains the antiquity, simply naming it Hebrew Gospel of Matthew and stating this:
“The main thrust of this second edition is to demonstrate that the Hebrew Matthew contained in Shem-Tob’s Even Bohan predates the 14th century. In my judgment, Shem-Tob the polemicist did not prepare this text by translating it from the Latin Vulgate, the Byzantine Greek, or any other known edition of the Gospel of Matthew. He received it from previous generations of Jewish scribes and tradents.”.
Howard had drawn attention to the probable presence of a fragment of the Arabic Diatessaron written by Issac Ben Velasco in 10th century while W.L. Petersen notices the presence of possible common readings with a Flemish middle ages diatessaron, something which might reinforce a Medieval origin for Hebrew Matthew.

3.	 Controversial manuscripts. The edition of George Howard is based on a manuscript preserved in the British Library, Adler 26964, for Mt 1,1- 23,22 and complemented by the missing final part, 23,23-28,20, with another version from the Theological Seminary of New York (Ms. 2426 [Marx 16]). The critical apparatus with variants of eight manuscripts is correct, and especially truthful, the manuscript of Leiden. However, the edition unfortunately omits those variants that according to Niclós are the most ancient and worthwhile, because they contain words in medieval romance, preserved in manuscripts of Italian libraries. Especially old and correct is the Neofiti Ms, 17,2 of the Vatican Library and the second one, the Plut II, 17 of the Laurenziana Library of Florence. The use of some vocabulary and lexica in Catalan or Pyrenees romance languages raised the option of tracing its Sitz im Leben back to the Middle Ages and more precisely to locate it in the region of Provence and Catalonia. Another paper, later on, studied carefully the Romance lexicon, especially rich in some fields as legal terminology, daily life, trades and roles, as well as cosmology; moreover, the Hebrew syntax of the text, concluded with narrative patterns based on correct biblical secuences and some rabbinical linguistic idioms. The result was defined as “an effort of Cultural Restitution to Hebrew: the theology of Matthew’s Gospel, which gathers and com- piles many expressions and procedures of the Hebrew Bible, passing through the veil of a Jewish mind of the Middle Ages” .The transcription of the words in the romance language proves the fruitfulness of the choice.

The process of creation of Hebrew Matthew. : 
This process has been studied as a text with different layers. 

The first stage of our Hebrew Gospel is the Latin Text of the Vulgate. In his latest paper, Niclós offers a final section about the Vulgate tradition of southern France, a tradition which derives from the Mozarab community (Christian minority under Muslim rule) from the south of Spain (Seville or Cordoba), who migrated to Catalonia (Ripoll), and finally entering the South of France by Carcassonne or Saint Victor of Marseille, making up the Provençal recension of the Vulgate. The reason for that multicultural presence lies in the fact that the region of Septimania or Provence and northern Catalonia were functioning as a cultural unit where the recension of the Bible referred to by Samuel Berger as Provençal was used both for liturgy and Romance translations. The second novelty of the paper consists in tracing back the Ordinary gloss introduced in Mt to a letter from Saint Jerome and a fragment of Rabanus Maurus Commentary of Matthew and other Medieval Scholars.  ("The Hebrew Gospel of Matthew in Shem Tob's Eben Boḥan, Particular Features and Medieval Sources", 156-157).

The second stage of our gospel was the translation of the New Testament into Provençal, probably from the abovementioned recension of the Vulgate from the south of France, of Visigoth and Septimanian origins. From Provençal, there came a shift from this version to Catalan vernacular language, with some marks of terms from the central Pyrenees. In this Romance stage, mendicant friars, such as Franciscan and Dominicans might have used it as a tool of their catechetical campaign toward the illiterate folk in the area. This translation to vernacular was permitted by the church despite the prohibition of 1229 in Toulouse or 1235 in Tarragona against the Waldensian romance versions; or from 1317 against the Beguines, it is unknown to what extent local and ephemeral. These versions could have been made in the first half of the 13th century, as can be proved by archaic features, such as the division into liturgical chapters for readings with temporal clauses of the type in illo tempore (“at that time”); and even some dozen of amplifications from the Ordinary Gloss which were added to the canonical text.

During the third stage, Hebrew Matthew is conceived as a translation to Hebrew from Catalan Language, between 1250 and 1320. At that moment, the Gospel of Matthew achieved a third layer from the Semitic language of the Old Testament, preserving numerous words of the Catalan from the Pyrenees as evidence of the previous stage. Finally, around 1386, in Tudela (Spain) a Jewish rabbi, Shem Tob Ibn Shaprut accurately copied the Hebrew version made a century earlier by an anonymous Jew, apparently converted, and incorporated his critical commentaries in a piece of religious controversy against Christians, Eben Boḥan (“the Touchstone”). The translation could have reached him through Vincent Ferrer or Cardinal Pedro de Luna. As a result, in final Hebrew Matthew we can obtain a valuable precipitate of biblical vocabulary, lexicon and rabbinical syntax from a medieval Jewish mind, and a layer of Romance terms about laws, flora and Jewish liturgical life; and finally, some traces of an Ancient Vulgate.

In other words, in this translation of the Gospel of Matthew to Hebrew, we notice a settlement of different cultural strata, the Vulgate of southern France recension of Visigoth origin, the ordinary gloss of Laon or the University of Paris, the preaching and liturgy in Romance languages, and more recently Hebrew biblical and rabbinical expressions, as a result of a plain collaboration or voluntary team-work. All this offers scholars, therefore, a new contribution to the reception of the Gospel of Saint Matthew and its cultural background throughout a long period of its history.

Ha-Shem 

Shem Tob's text contains Ha-Shem 19 times:

For ה״,  the corresponding Greek Gospel of Matthew text has θεός (22:31), or κύριος (1:22, 24; 2:13, 19; 3:3; 4:7, 10; 21:9, 42; 22:37, 44; 28:2). For one place (5:33) as לה״.  Three places it has no corresponding sentence or phrase (21:12; 22:32; 27:9) in NT and OT to contain the word. Once (28:9) it has השם ('name') where the Gospel of Matthew in the Greek New Testament has no corresponding sentence.

It employs not only in Matthew's Old Testament quotations, but also in his narrative, either when introducing such quotations (1:22, 22:31) or in fixed phrases such as "angel of the Lord" (1:24, 2:13, 2:19, 28:2) or "the house of the Lord" (21:12).

As George Howard, referring to Ha-Shem as "the Divine Name", wrote:

Recent editions and translations 

The first translation of Shem Tob's Hebrew Gospel of Matthew into English was George Howard's Hebrew Gospel of Matthew, published in 1987. A Polish translation by Eliezer Wolski (Eliyazar Ben Miqra), a Jewish theologian and Chassidic sympathizer, appeared in 2017. He presented the Hebrew text in stylized font imitating first-century Hebrew script. Grzegorz Kaszyński made another translation into Polish and published it along with Howard's English translation and other translations into European languages.

The following table (in Polish) shows how these translations represented the phrase "ha-Shem".

{{center|'Twenty-two translations of "Ha-Shem" in Shem Tob's Hebrew Gospel of Matthew}}

 Extant manuscripts 
28 manuscripts containing the Gospel of Matthew of Shem Tob are known to have survived until the present time. These manuscripts are dated between the fifteenth and seventeenth centuries. The most significant manuscripts are:

Ms. British Museum Library Add. No. 26964, London
Ms. Heb. 28, Rijksuniveriteit Library, Leiden, Netherlands
Ms. Mich. 119. Bodleian Library, Oxford
Ms. Oppenheim Add. 4° 72, Bodleian Library, Oxford
Ms. Oppenheim Add. 4° 111, Bodleian Library, Oxford
Ms. 2209 (Marx 19), Library of the Jewish Theological Seminary of America, New York
Ms. 2234 (Marx 15), Library of the Jewish Theological Seminary of America, New York
Ms. 2279 (Marx 18), Library of the Jewish Theological Seminary of America, New York
Ms. 2426 (Marx 16), Library of the Jewish Theological Seminary of America, New York
Ms Vat.ebr.101, Vatican Library

 Translations into other languages 
There are translations of the Gospel of Matthew from the work of Shem Tob in several European languages. Among them are:
 English:
 Hebrew Gospel of Matthew, George E. Howard (1985)
 Messianic Natzratim Study Bible, Bill Carlson (1993)
 The Book of God: Matthew, Tov Rose (2013)
 Hebrew Matthew Shem Tov (PDF), ? Newton (adatmoadim.com), 2013
 Shem Tov’s Hebrew Matthew: Sacred Name Version, Daniel W. Merrick (2015)
 Hebrew Matthew, vol. One (Chapters 1–12), Jason S. Lorent (2017)
 Finnish:
 Evankeliumi Matteuksen mukaan – Shem Tob, Tuomas Levänen (2015)
 French:
 Livre de Mattityahou d'apres le texte Hébreu Shem Tov, Ruth ...?... (2012)
 Spanish:Toldot Iehoshua. La Historia de nuestro Rav el Mashiaj Iehoshua Ben Iosef de Natzrat por: Matityah HaLevi, Avdiel Ben Oved (2004)
 [Toldot Jeshua al-pi Matitjah] / Historia de Yeshúa Según Matityah, José Antonio Álvarez Rivera (2009–2010)Evangelio Hebreo de Mateo, versión critica de los 116 capítulos, Eliahu Almani, Oraj HaEmet (2010)
 J. V. NICLÓS ALBARRACÍN, El evangelio de san Mateo en hebreo (en la edición del Eben Bohan de Shem Tob ibn Shaprut), Madrid, 2018
 Dutch:
 Hebreeuws Mattheüs (online version), 2014-2023
 Het Mattheüsevangelie (vertaald vanuit het Hebreeuws), 2020
 Polish:
 Ewangelia św. Mateusza po hebrajsku, Eliezer Wolski (2017)
 In preparation:
 Ewangelia według Mateusza z dzieła Szem-Toba ’Ewen Bōḥan (Kamień Wypróbowany) – wydanie z tekstem hebrajskim, przypisami, Dodatkiem Analitycznym oraz uwypukleniem różnic wobec kanonicznego tekstu, Grzegorz Kaszyński
 Hebrajska Ewangelia według św. Mateusza (Shem Tob), Piotr Goniszewski
 Portuguese:
 Evangelho segundo Matityah Shem Tov: História de Yeshu Segundo Matityah de Shem Tov Ben Isaac, Maurício Carijo (2012)
 Torat Yehoshua Segundo o Evangelho Hebraico de Mateus, Bruno Summa, 2019
 Romanian:
 Shem Tov Evanghelia Mathyahu ebraic-română-text online, Obedeya Dorin David Aurel Ben Aharon Cohen (chapters 1–12), 2013
 Russian:
 Евангелие от Матфея на иврите в издании Шем-Това ибн-Шапрута (с параллельным русским переводом), A.С. Manykian (Манукян), Dniepropietrowsk 2015
 Еврейское Евангелие от Матфея переданное Шем-Товом (chapters 1–3), Eliseus?, 2016
 Serbian:
 Jevanđelje po Mateju: preveo sa hebrejskog (PDF), Željko Stanojević, 2010

Claim of support received 

The Kingdom Interlinear Translation of the Greek Scriptures (1969), published by the Jehovah's Witnesses' Watchtower Society, refers to Shem Tob's Hebrew Gospel of Matthew (indicated by the siglum J²) in support of its decision to introduce "Jehovah" into the text of the New World Translation of the New Testament.

References 

1380s books
14th-century Christian texts
14th-century biblical manuscripts
Bible versions and translations
Gospel of Matthew
Hebrew manuscripts
Jewish–Christian debate
Jewish outreach
Jewish Spanish history
Jewish apologetics
Jews and Judaism in Spain
New Testament
Books critical of Christianity